This is a list of sister states, regions, and cities in the U.S. state of Maryland. Sister cities, known in Europe as town twins, are cities which partner with each other to promote human contact and cultural links, although this partnering is not limited to cities and often includes counties, regions, states and other sub-national entities.

Many Maryland jurisdictions partner with foreign cities through Sister Cities International, an organization whose goal is to, "Promote peace through mutual respect, understanding, and cooperation." The first sister city relationship in Maryland, however, was between Salisbury, Maryland and Salisbury, England, and predated Sister Cities International. Sister cities interact with each other across a broad range of activities, from health care and education to business and the arts. The partnerships in this list vary in how formalized their relationships are. Recently, a number of Maryland cities have partnered with cities in Estonia through a program developed by the Maryland National Guard after Estonia gained its independence from the Soviet Union.
<onlyinclude>

Sister states, regions and cities of Maryland

Sister cities of Maryland cities and counties

|}

See also
List of twin towns and sister cities

Notes

Maryland
Populated places in Maryland
Sister cities
Cities in Maryland